Anindya Kusuma Putri (born 3 February 1992) is an Indonesian actress, television host, beauty pageant titleholder who was crowned Puteri Indonesia 2015. She represented her country at the Miss Universe 2015 pageant. She is the fourth Indonesian and the second Javanese to be called as Miss Universe Finalist.

Early life and career
Anindya was born and raised in Semarang and graduated in 2016 as Bachelor of Engineering from Urban and Regional Planning at Diponegoro University, Semarang, Indonesia. Previously, she was President of the AIESEC International Youth Organization at her university and did social projects. In 2008, she won the title of Gadis Sampul 2008. In 2011, she placed as the 1st Runner-up of Puteri Indonesia Central Java 2011 where Maria Selena won the title and was later crowned as the Puteri Indonesia 2011. She represented Indonesia at The 41st Ship for South East Asian and Japanese Youth Program in 2014 and was selected as chairwoman for Sub-Committee of Solidarity Group. In 2015 she returned to compete at the same pageant and won. She represented her province at the 19th annual Puteri Indonesia 2015 pageant and became the winner. Eleven months after her winning, she went to Las Vegas, Nevada, United States, represented Indonesia in the 64th Miss Universe competition. Following the Miss Universe, Anindya worked as the Spokesperson for the Minister of Youth and Sports of the Republic of Indonesia in 2017–2018. She resigned from her role in the Ministry after she got accepted in a business school in London - Great Britain and finished her second Diploma of Business of Administration in August 2019.

Pageantry

Puteri Indonesia 2015
Anindya is the third woman from Central Java to win Puteri Indonesia after Agni Pratistha in 2006 and Maria Selena in 2011. Anindya was crowned as the winner of Puteri Indonesia 2015 on February 20, 2015, at Jakarta Convention Center, Jakarta. The runners-up were Chintya Fabyola of West Kalimantan and Gresya Amanda Maaliwuga of North Sulawesi. Altogether, thirty seven ladies from 33 provinces competed at the 19th Puteri Indonesia 2015 pageant. Paulina Vega, Miss Universe 2014 attended the event and accompanied Anindya in her victory walk.

Miss Universe 2015
As Puteri Indonesia 2015, Anindya competed at the Miss Universe 2015 pageant where she placed in the top fifteen. Pia Wurtzbach of the Philippines won the title of Miss Universe 2015.

After the competition, she has successfully organized and hosted the Miss Universe 2015 reunion in Indonesia twice (2018 and 2019).

Filmography
Anindya has appeared in several movies. She has acted in the cinema box-office film.

Movies

See also

 Puteri Indonesia 2015
 Miss Universe 2015
 Chintya Fabyola
 Gresya Amanda Maaliwuga
 Syarifah Olvah Bwefar Alhamid

References

External links
 
 

Living people
1992 births
Miss Universe 2015 contestants
People from Semarang
Javanese people
Diponegoro University alumni
Indonesian beauty pageant winners
Indonesian female models
Indonesian Muslims
Puteri Indonesia winners